

Events calendar

+6